The third season of Dynasty, an American television series based on the 1980s prime time soap opera of the same name, premiered in the United States on The CW on October 11, 2019. The season is produced by CBS Television Studios, with Josh Reims as showrunner and executive producer alongside executive producers Josh Schwartz and Stephanie Savage. Dynasty was renewed for a third season on January 31, 2019, and for a fourth season on January 10, 2020. Production of season three was suspended in March 2020 as a direct result of the COVID-19 pandemic, with only 20 of a planned 22 episodes completed.

Season three stars Elizabeth Gillies as Fallon Carrington, Grant Show as her father Blake Carrington, Daniella Alonso (replacing Ana Brenda Contreras) as Blake's new wife Cristal, and Sam Underwood as Fallon's brother Adam Carrington, with Robert Christopher Riley as Michael Culhane, Sam Adegoke as Jeff Colby, Rafael de la Fuente as Sam Jones, Adam Huber as Fallon's fiancé Liam Ridley, Alan Dale as Joseph Anders, Maddison Brown as Kirby, and Michael Michele as Dominique Deveraux. New series regular Elaine Hendrix takes over the role of Alexis Carrington. Notable recurring characters featured in season three include Monica Colby (Wakeema Hollis); Laura Van Kirk (Sharon Lawrence); Vanessa Deveraux (Jade Payton); and Fletcher Myers (Daniel Di Tomasso).

Cast and characters

Main
 Elizabeth Gillies as Fallon Carrington, a self-made CEO and heiress who is the daughter of billionaire Blake Carrington and his first wife, Alexis
 Daniella Alonso as Cristal Jennings Carrington, a physical therapist who becomes Blake's third wife
 Rafael de La Fuente as Samuel Josiah "Sammy Jo" Jones Carrington, nephew of Blake's second wife Celia, and Steven Carrington's ex-husband
 Sam Underwood as Adam Carrington, Blake and Alexis's eldest son, a doctor
 Michael Michele as Dominique Deveraux, Jeff and Monica's mother and Blake's half-sister
 Robert Christopher Riley as Michael Culhane, Fallon's ex-fiancé, formerly the Carrington chauffeur
 Sam Adegoke as Jeff Colby, Dominique's son and Blake's nephew, a billionaire tech genius
 Maddison Brown as Kirby Anders, Joseph's daughter
 Adam Huber as Liam Ridley, Fallon's fiancé
 Alan Dale as Joseph Anders, the Carrington majordomo
 Grant Show as Blake Carrington, billionaire and the father of Adam and Fallon by his first wife, Alexis
 Elaine Hendrix as Alexis Carrington Colby, Blake's ex-wife, Jeff's current wife and Adam, Steven, and Fallon's mother.

Recurring

 Wakeema Hollis as Monica Colby, Jeff's sister
 Kelli Barrett as Nadia, Adam's physical therapist
 Jade Payton as Vanessa Deveraux, an aspiring singer who is Dominique's stepdaughter 
 Daniel Di Tomasso as Fletcher Myers, a public relations consultant 
 Emily Rudd as Heidi, Liam's former girlfriend 
 John Jackson Hunter as Connor, Heidi's young son
 Sharon Lawrence as Laura Van Kirk, Liam's mother
 Ken Kirby as Evan Tate, brother of Fallon's late childhood friend Trixie

Guest
 Taylor Black as Ashley Cunningham, Liam's ex-fiancee'
 Jessi Goei as Trixie Tate, Fallon's late childhood friend
 Rob Nagle as Mitchell, Blake's lawyer
 Kelly Rutherford as Melissa Daniels, Steven's former lover
 Chase Anderson as Tony, the Carrington gardener
 Natalie Karp as Mrs. Gunnerson, the Carrington cook
 Christian Ochoa as Victor, a new player on the Atlantix
 Ashanti as herself
 Pierson Fodé as Joel Turner, a motivational speaker who becomes involved with Kirby
 Chukwudi Iwuji as Landon, a creative director and old friend of Liam
 Erin Cummings as District Attorney Erica Brown, the prosecutor in Blake's murder trial
 Nicole Zyana as Allison, Fallon's assistant
 Keller Wortham as Jacks Davis, Fallon's real estate agent
 Lilli Cooper as Stacey, a reality show producer
 Geovanni Gopradi as Roberto "Beto" Flores, Cristal's brother
 Wil Traval as Father Caleb Collins, a priest who is the new hospital chaplain
 Mustafa Elzein as Ramy Crockett, Sam's criminal friend
 Alice Hunter as Sydney Newlove, a fashion podcaster
 Shannon Thornton as Mia, a college friend of Jeff's
 Laura Osnes as Donna, a singer in the duo Kelly and Donna
 Najah Bradley as Kelly, a singer in the duo Kelly and Donna
 Aerica D'Amaro as Dr. Bailey, Adam's supervisor at the hospital
 Danny Trejo as himself
 Lachlan Buchanan as Ryan, a stripper Sam briefly marries
Cast notes

Episodes

Production

Development
Dynasty was renewed for a third season on January 31, 2019. In May 2019, Deadline Hollywood reported that co-executive producer Josh Reims would succeed co-creator Sallie Patrick as executive producer and showrunner for season three. On January 7, 2020, Dynasty was renewed for a fourth season.

Casting
In July 2019, it was announced that Ana Brenda Contreras would not be returning for season three for personal reasons, and that Daniella Alonso would take over the role of Cristal. In August 2019, it was reported that Michael Michele had been promoted to a series regular for the third season, and it was announced in October 2019 that Adam Huber had been promoted to a series regular as well. On September 5, 2019, Ken Kirby was announced to be joining the show in a recurring role as Evan Tate, Trixie's older brother. Kelli Barrett and Jade Payton also joined the show in recurring roles, Barrett acting as Adam's nurse, Nadia, and Payton portraying Dominique's stepdaughter, Vanessa.

On October 28, 2019, it was announced that the role of Alexis Carrington had been recast with Elaine Hendrix, who would appear as a series regular. The CW noted that "Alexis is back in Atlanta, with a new look, a new man, and plenty of scores to settle". Hendrix debuted as Alexis in "The Sensational Blake Carrington Trial". In February 2020, it was announced that Wil Traval had been cast to recur as Father Caleb Collins, a "young, charming and irreverent priest with a soft spot for the disabled vets who rehab in the hospital's clinic." He was teased as a potential love interest for Cristal. Danny Trejo appeared as himself in the May 2020 episode "Robin Hood Rescues".

Filming
Production of Dynasty was suspended in March 2020 as a direct result of the COVID-19 pandemic. Filming of only 20 of the 22 ordered episodes of the third season had been completed at that time. Gillies said, "So there is no finale at this juncture, and there is no episode before the finale. So it ends in a very weird place ... I don't know if we'll pick up the finale later, I’m not sure what the plan is. It certainly shouldn't end on the episode we finished, because it's just really random and nothing’s resolved. I apologize if it does." It was later confirmed that the 20th episode of the season, "My Hangover's Arrived", would serve as the season finale, though it has not been announced whether the remaining two episodes of the season will be produced later.

Reims said in May 2020 that the writers had been building to Fallon and Liam's wedding all season, and it was "frustrating" to not be able to film the last two episodes. Hoping to use reworked versions of the two scripts to start the fourth season, Reims teased Blake going to war with Alexis, Jeff and Adam; Sam's new relationship with Ryan; and the return of the Moldavians.

Broadcast
Season three of Dynasty premiered on October 11, 2019, and the season finale aired on May 8, 2020. Unlike previous seasons, the full third season was released globally on Netflix on May 23, 2020, a few weeks after the season finale.

Reception
Season three debuted at No. 1 on Netflix's list of most watched series for the week of May 18 through May 24, 2020.

Ratings

References

External links
 
 

2019 American television seasons
2020 American television seasons
Dynasty (2017 TV series) seasons
Television productions suspended due to the COVID-19 pandemic